Myna is a 2013 Indian Kannada language romance drama film written and directed by Nagashekar. Based on a real-life incident, the film was produced by N. S. Rajkumar for Vajreshwari Combines. Chetan Kumar and Nithya Menen played the lead roles. Jassie Gift is the music director for the film. The film won Filmfare Award for Best Film – Kannada. The film is currently being remade in Hindi.

Plot

The film begins with Satya being chased by the police. He is caught and is charged with a 34 serial murder case. While being transported to Bangalore on criminal charges, he shares his story with ACP B. B. Ashok Kumar, the officer who is leading the team that arrested him. How Satya met Mynaa is revealed in a flashback sequences.

Satya was one of the contenders of a reality game show played near Dudhsagar Falls. In one of the tasks, he is to collect as much money as possible incognito. He chooses to beg as a disabled person using a trolley to push himself. On the train he spots a girl named Mynaa and is instantly infatuated by her. She gives him a  note and asks him to use it wisely. He would have won the challenge in the reality show had he surrendered the note. He refuses and as a consequence, has to quit the show. Satya is not disappointed by the turn of events and he considers using his time to pursue Mynaa. He pretends to be a disabled person every single day, but instead of begging he begins selling newspapers in the train that Mynaa frequents. This immensely pleases Mynaa. She starts falling in love with Satya. Slowly, they start conversing more. One day, they decide on meeting for a lengthy conversation. In this encounter, Mynaa confesses her feelings for Satya, and she is about to tell him the biggest secret of her life. Suddenly, her bag gets stolen. Satya, abandoning his pretense, catches the thieves responsible and retrieves the bag to Mynaa. She confesses that she is disabled and admits that she thought that Satya was also like her and was the reason why she liked him and considered him the perfect match for her. She expresses her discontent for Satya's lies, but she turns back and asks him if he still likes her. Satya responds that he will always like her, no matter what and will love her forever. Satya also reveals that he knew about her inability to walk. They then resolve their problems, decide to trust each other. They get married and run away from Castle Rock to Bangalore.

Once in Bangalore, they move into a house and Satya finds a job as a cab driver and Mynaa as a voice support engineer at a small software company; they live the happiest moments of their lives in this period of time in a small house. Mynaa gets recommended by her boss to join a bigger software company. Everything is going well for them, Satya says his dream in life is to see Mynaa chase him around standing on her own feet. He tells her of Dr.Anirudh Desai, who is confident of getting her operated and make her stand again. On Satya's insistence, Mynaa visits Dr.Anirudh Desai, who recommends a full body scan, who reluctantly obliges to this. Anirudh, in a breach of ethics, makes a nude video of her when she is drugged. He threatens her later to submit to his mercy. Mynaa tries to hide this fact from Satya, who finds out the truth when he takes her phone to a repair store. Satya invites the doctor home without the knowledge of Mynaa and politely asks the Anirudh to hand over the video and not publicize the video. Anirudh refuses and insists on having his way, This enrages Satya and manhandles him but Anirudh continues to incite him and Satya breaks down and kills Anirudh. He disposes the dead body by cleverly making it look like a car accident. Satya convinces Mynaa to leave for Chennai at once stating he has had a transfer to which she agrees. They meet a different doctor, who has a good track record of curing polio patients. Mynaa agrees to get the operation done. Satya goes to the bank to draw money, but he gets a call from an old friend of Mynaa, Revathi, who asks him to meet her at the beach.

This turns out to be a trap set by the police and Satya ends up being in custody of ACP Kumar, to whom  he has been narrating the story. Upon hearing the story, Ashok sympathizes with Satya. It is revealed that there have been many false allegations on Satya, who has only committed one murder. Ashok convinces his brother, who is a criminal lawyer, to save Satya from the false 34 serial murder case. Ashok leaves Satya out of custody as an expression of his faith in Satya, who is provided shelter by Ashok's friend. Ashok and his friend both come under lot of pressure from their superiors and the government to produce former to court. They are also negatively projected by the media. Satya on overhearing a conversation between Ashok had his friend, learns that they have succumbed to the pressure from the government and that they intend to have him jailed. Satya quietly escapes and witnesses his wife being taken to a hostel by the police, hidden. He calls his old friend form Castle Rock (Dudhsagar) and requests him to bring Mynaa to Kengeri railway station, who agrees. Against this dramatic facade, people who are planning to kill Satya have also gathered. Ashok brings his sharp team of police officers to the station. They grab the gang trying to kill Satya. But, as a safety measure Ashok has stationed police with pointed guns on Satya. Satya meets Mynaa and lifts her in his arms and carries her; the train passes and Ashok's view of Satya is obscured.

Satya starts to run away with Mynaa. Ashok who knows the police might shoot Satya orders them Don't shoot, but the train sound flushes the Don't from his command. The constables shoot down Satya, also killing Mynaa in cross fire. The couple both die holding each other in their arms.

Cast

 Chetan Kumar as Sathyamurthy
 Nithya Menen as Mynaa
 R. Sarath Kumar as ACP B. B. Ashok Kumar
 Suman Ranganath as Geetha
 Sumithra as Mynaa's mother
 Malavika Avinash as Revathi
 Tabla Nani as Forest Guard 
 Raju Talikote as Diganth Doddamani
 Sunetra Pandit as Doddamani's wife
 Ajay as Anirudh Desai
 Arun Sagar as Sanjay Desai
 Jai Jagadish as Police commissioner Avinash Pande
 Sadhu Kokila as beggar in train
 Bullet Prakash as ticket collector
 Bank Suresh as police constable 
 Yathiraj as Traffic police inspector 
 Loknath in a cameo appearance
 Venkat Rao in a cameo appearance
 Umesh in a cameo appearance
 Bangalore Nagesh in a cameo appearance
 Akul Balaji (cameo appearance) as game show host
 Vijayasarathi in a cameo appearance
 Nagathihalli Chandrashekhar in a cameo appearance
 Suhasini Maniratnam in a cameo appearance
 Anant Nag in a cameo appearance
 Dileep 
 P.Ravishankar 
 Ravi varma
 Uday mehta 
 Gowrish Akki as newsreader

Production
Myna is based on a real-life incident. Ex-cop BB Ashok Kumar, the man who had detected more than 100 murder cases, narrated a murder mystery to the director that became the subject of the story. The cameraman Kashi, editor Johny Harsha, and music director Jassie Gift of Sanju Weds Geetha were retained in the team by director Nagashekhar.

The shooting of this movie was done across the Konkan stretch of Karnataka including the astounding locales of Dudhsagar waterfalls on the borders of Karnataka & Goa. The locations include the coastline of Uttara Kannada.

Soundtrack

Jassie Gift composed all the songs while Kaviraj and V. Nagendra Prasad wrote the lyrics.

Reception

Critical response 

A critic from The Times of India scored the film at 4 out of 5 stars and says "Nithya Menen as the girl next door brings cheers and tears with her amazing performance as a physically challenged girl with an innocent smile. Full marks to Chethan for his expression, body language and dialogue delivery. Jassie Gift has some catchy numbers for you. But it’s cinematographer Sathya Hegde who walks away with all honours". Y Maheswara Reddy of DNA scored the film at 4 out of 5 stars and says "Myna is a love story. But it isn’t a boy-meets-girl kind of tale. It has its bittersweet moments laced with enough action. An interesting story line, backed by decent screenplay, Myna is definitely a good watch". Srikanta Srinivasa of Rediff.com scored the film at 3 out of 5 stars and wrote "Mynaa is worth a watch for those who are in love and who believe in giving unconditional love to their partner".

Box office
It was in 22 centers for 50 days, collected around ₹7 crores at the box-office  and was in some theaters across Karnataka for 100 days.

Awards

References

External links
 

2013 films
Indian films based on actual events
2010s Kannada-language films
2013 romantic drama films
Films scored by Jassie Gift
Kannada films remade in other languages
Indian romantic drama films